Bed & Breakfast is a 1992 American romantic comedy film directed by Robert Ellis Miller, and stars Roger Moore, Talia Shire, Colleen Dewhurst (in her final film role) and Nina Siemaszko. It began filming on York Beach, Maine in 1989.

Plot
A charming Englishman changes the lives of three generations of women who run a near-bankrupt bed and breakfast. Three women find him out cold on a beach and offer him free board in return for fixing the place up and being the handy man. Claire, widow of Senator Blake Wellesly, is initially unwilling to let him in the house, partly due to the mystery around him caused by amnesia. Her mother-in-law Ruth, recently retired and craving adventure, insists on allowing him inside. Claire's teenage daughter Cassie, who is rebellious against her mother's old-fashioned behavior most of the time, names him Adam.

Cast
Roger Moore as Adam
Talia Shire as Claire Wellesly
Colleen Dewhurst as Ruth Wellesly
Nina Siemaszko as Cassie Wellesly
Ford Rainey as Amos
Stephen Root as Randolph
Jamie Walters as Mitch
Cameron Arnett as Hilton
Bryant Bradshaw as Julius
Victor Slezak as Alex Caxton
Jake Weber as Bobby

References

External links

1992 films
1992 romantic comedy films
American romantic comedy films
Films directed by Robert Ellis Miller
Films scored by David Shire
Films shot in Maine
1990s English-language films
1990s American films